Szaniszló Priszter (1917–2011) was a Hungarian botanist.

Publications 
 Móró, mária anna; szaniszló Priszter, lászló gy. Szabó. Plantae Asiaticae Rariores

Books 
 vera Csapody, szaniszló Priszter. 1966. Magyar növénynevek szótára (növenynevek diccionario húngaro). Ed. Budapest, Mezógazdasági Kiadó. 301 pp.
 1975. Iconographia florae partis austro-orientalis Europae centralis = Iconography of the flora from the south-eastern part of central Europe / Jávorka--Csapody. Ed. Budapest : Adadémiai Kiadó. xl + 576 pp. . 2ª ed. 1991
 1979. A magyar flóra képekben. Stuttgart: S. Fischer [Germany], 1979. 703, 79 pp. il.
 Prisztler, szaniszló; attila l. Borhidi. 1983. Arbores fruticesque europae : vocabularium octo linguis redactum / composuit Szaniszló Priszter ; operis socii Attila Borhidi ... [et al.]. 300 pp. 
 1986. Növényneveink, magyar-latin szógyűjtemény (Növényneveink vocabulario húngaro-américano). Mezőgazdasági Kiadó, Budapest. 191 pp. 
 zoltan Kadar, szaniszlo Priszter. 1992. Az elovilag Megismeresenek Kezdetei Hazankban: A Magyar Biologia Rovid Kulturtortenete a Kezdetektol a Reformkorig ( -1829) (Comienza la exploración de la vida silvestre en Hungría: el húngaro Asimov Cultural desde el principio de la Reforma). Ed. Akadémiai Kiadó.  
 Vörös, éva: priszter Szaniszló. 1997. Márton József természethistóriai képeskönyvének növénynevei (historia natural de Márton József). 69 pp.

References 

 

 

Hungarian writers
1917 births
2011 deaths